The Grand Order of National Merit was founded by King Norodom Sihanouk on 5 October 1995. It is awarded in one class to foreign Heads of State and to Cambodian nationals who have performed exceptional services to the nation.

Recipients
Kao Kim Hourn (2015)
Chea Sim (2007) 
Bour Kry (2007)
Norodom Ranariddh (2001)
Hun Sen (1996)

References

External links

Les Compagnons de la Libération - Croix et Attributs ", de Cyrille CARDONA, édité par la SAMOL, 2022, ISBN : 978-2-9581971-0-0

 Indochina Medals, THE ORDERS AND MEDALS OF THE KINGDOM OF CAMBODIA
 Medals of the World, Kingdom of Cambodia: Royal Order of Moniseraphon

Orders, decorations, and medals of Cambodia
1995 establishments in Cambodia
Awards established in 1995
French protectorate of Cambodia
Orders of chivalry of France
Colonial orders of chivalry